Manta is a surname. Notable people with the surname include:

Alexandru Manta (born 1977), Romanian rugby union player
Karina Manta (born 1996), American ice dancer
João Abel Manta (born 1928), Portuguese architect, painter, illustrator and cartoonist
Lorenzo Manta (born 1974), Swiss tennis player
Paul Manta (born 1943), Romanian footballer